Continental Shelf Act 1964 may refer to:

Continental Shelf Act 1964 (New Zealand)
Continental Shelf Act 1964 (United Kingdom)